Margaret Jamieson (born 1953 in Kilmarnock) is a retired Scottish Labour. She was the Member of the Scottish Parliament (MSP) for Kilmarnock and Loudoun constituency from 1999 to 2007.

In 2007 she lost her seat to Willie Coffey of the Scottish National Party (SNP).

Prior to 1999 she had worked as a UNISON official.

External links 
 
 Margaret Jamieson MSP profile at the site of Scottish Labour
 Constituency website

1953 births
Living people
Labour MSPs
Members of the Scottish Parliament 1999–2003
Members of the Scottish Parliament 2003–2007
20th-century Scottish women politicians
Female members of the Scottish Parliament
People from Kilmarnock